Bailey Colin Wright (born 28 July 1992) is an Australian professional footballer who plays for EFL Championship club Rotherham United, on loan from Sunderland, and the Australia national team.

Wright has played his entire senior career in England, with Preston North End, Bristol City and Sunderland.

He has played 24 times for Australia and was selected for Australia's 23-man squad for the 2014 FIFA World Cup in Brazil.

Club career
Wright spent his formative years at Langwarrin, before playing a season each with Mornington and Dandenong Thunder. He was identified as a promising talent, eventually earning selection for the Victorian state team in 2007. He honed his skills further with the Victorian Institute of Sport in 2008, returning to Langwarrin in 2009 where he made several senior league appearances, before moving overseas in July 2009, signing a two-year scholarship with Preston North End after a protracted clearance saga.

Preston North End
In his first season with Preston North End, Wright played predominantly as a centre-half for the reserves and under-18 teams, but was eventually called up to the senior squad in April, sitting on the bench for the club's fixture away to Coventry City. He commenced the 2010–11 season with his debut senior appearance in the first round of the League Cup, playing the full 90 minutes in the Lilywhites' 5–0 win against Stockport County. On 13 December 2010, Wright was handed a two-and-a-half-year professional contract.

Wright made his league debut for Preston on 5 March 2011 against Norwich City. He scored his first professional goal for Preston on 7 April 2012 against MK Dons.

Wright was voted Young Player of the Year of Preston North End for the 2012–13 season. On 1 May 2013, he was handed a new two-year contract, with the option of staying at Preston North End for another year.

Wright won promotion via the play-Offs with Preston in 2015, defeating Swindon Town 4–0 at Wembley on 24 May 2015.

Bristol City

On 6 January 2017, it was announced that Wright joined Bristol City for an undisclosed fee, signing a -year contract. On 7 January 2017, he made his debut in the FA Cup third round tie against Fleetwood Town. He scored his first goal for Bristol City in a 1–1 draw with Norwich City on 7 March 2017. At the start of the 2017–18 season, Wright was named Bristol City captain.

Wright featured as Bristol City reached the semi finals of the 2017–18 EFL Cup with wins over Premier League opponents Watford, Stoke City, Crystal Palace and Manchester United. Wright played as City lost in the semi-final tie against Premier League leaders Manchester City. Wright was released by Bristol City at the end of his contract in July 2020.

Sunderland
Wright signed a six-month loan deal with League One club Sunderland on 21 January 2020. On 2 August 2020, Wright signed for Sunderland on a permanent basis, on a two-year deal. He scored his first goal for Sunderland in a 2–2 draw with Rochdale on 27 October 2020.

Wright joined fellow Championship club Rotherham United in a deadline day loan move on 31 January 2023.

International career
Wright was a member of the Australia under-17 squad that reached the quarter-finals of the AFC U-16 Championship, narrowly missing a place at the 2009 FIFA U-17 World Cup when they lost 2–3 against United Arab Emirates.

He was also selected as part of Ange Postecoglou's 23-man squad for the 2014 FIFA World Cup in Brazil, one of two new inclusions.

Wright made his national debut starting in a friendly match against Saudi Arabia at Craven Cottage in London. He scored a header in this debut giving Australia a two-goal lead.

He was in the Australia national football team preliminary squad for the 2018 World Cup in Russia but did not make Bert van Marwijk's final 23.

Career statistics

Club

International

As of match played 15 November 2017. Australia score listed first, score column indicates score after each Wright goal.

Honours
Preston North End
Football League One play-offs: 2015
Sunderland
EFL Trophy: 2020–21
EFL League One play-offs: 2022

References

External links

1992 births
Living people
Soccer players from Melbourne
Australian expatriate soccer players
Australia youth international soccer players
Australia international soccer players
Australian expatriate sportspeople in England
Expatriate footballers in England
Preston North End F.C. players
Bristol City F.C. players
Sunderland A.F.C. players
Rotherham United F.C. players
English Football League players
2014 FIFA World Cup players
2017 FIFA Confederations Cup players
2022 FIFA World Cup players
Association football defenders
Australian soccer players
Victorian Institute of Sport alumni